Parvati Valley is situated in the northern Indian state of Himachal Pradesh. From the confluence of the Parvati River with the River Beas, the Parvati Valley runs eastwards, through a steep-sided valley from the town of Bhuntar, in the Kullu district of Himachal Pradesh in Northern India.

Overview

The precipitous valley road climbs past a side valley leading to the village of Malana near the famous tourist spot Kasol. From here, the road passes through the Sikh and Hindu pilgrimage town of Manikaran and terminates at Pulga, where the construction of the Parvati Hydel Project, a hydroelectric dam, dominates the landscape. From Pulga, the footpath climbs to a temple and small dhaba at Rudra-Nag waterfall, apparently after its resemblance of a water snake. Beyond Rudra-Nag waterfall, the trail ascends further through thick pine forests to the spiritual site of Kheerganga where Shiva is said to have meditated for 3000 years. The hot springs at Kheerganga are extremely important for Hindu and Sikh pilgrims as well as many others who believe the waters have sacred healing properties.

From Kheerganga to the site of Tunda Bhuj village (3285m) the Parvati Valley cuts a steep-sided gorge through the mountains and as the altitude increases, the thick, coniferous forest gradually makes way for patches of meadowland scattered with boulders.
Several tributaries join the main Parvati River and numerous waterfalls cascade down the steep valley sides. Beyond Tunda Bhuj, the conifers continue only as far as the Basuki Nal tributary but groves of silver birch continue to line the valley, quickly becoming sparse as the altitude increases.

At Thakur Kuan village (3560m), the Parvati Valley meets the valley of Dibibokri Nal river which is a tributary of Parvati River, which climbs towards the Northeast to the Dibibokri Glacier and Dibibokri Pyramid mountain peak (6400m). The area is characterised by abundant alpine flowers and rocky outcrops glittering with mica.  Beyond Thakur Kuan village, the Parvati Valley ascends gradually to Pandupul village (Pandu Pul) where two natural, rock bridges cross the Parvati River and a southern tributary. According to legend, these bridges were created by the massive strength of the Pandava brothers.
 
From Pandupul, the wide valley of the upper Parvati valley climbs gradually through the wide, high-altitude meadowland of Odi Thatch to the sacred site of Mantalai Lake (4100m), the source of the Parvati River. Continuing east from Mantalai lake, it is possible to cross the Pin Parvati Pass (5319m) into the Pin Valley National Park and on to the Mudh village in the Lahul and Spiti district of Himachal Pradesh.

Parvati Valley's scenic trekking routes are a popular destination for trekkers and tourists.

Gallery

References 

 (second edition)

External links 

Geography of Kullu district
Valleys of Himachal Pradesh